Woody Herman–1963 is a 1963 studio album by Woody Herman and his big band. The album peaked at 136 on the Billboard 200.

Reception

Ken Dryden reviewed the album for Allmusic and wrote that "While this is hardly "the Swingin'est Big Band Ever," as hyped...this 1963 edition of Woody Herman's big band is a strong one, with an emphasis on well-constructed blues charts. The only letdown of the date is Herman's throwaway vocal chorus in Chase's "Camel Walk," which follows the leader's potent clarinet solo". Dryden praised Sal Nistico's performance on "Sister Sadie" and Phil Wilson's solo on "Don't Get Around Much Anymore" and "It's a Lonesome Old Town (When You're Not Around)".

Track listing 
 "Mo-Lasses" (Joe Newman) - 6:45
 "Blues for J.P." (Horace Parlan) - 3:33
 "Don't Get Around Much Anymore" (Duke Ellington, Bob Russell) - 4:21
 "Tunin' In" (Nat Pierce) - 4:20
 "Sister Sadie" (Horace Silver) - 3:30
 "Sig Ep" (Jack Gale) - 3:53
 "It's a Lonesome Old Town (When You're Not Around)" (Charles Kisco, Harry Tobias, Egbert Van Alstyne) - 3:05
" Camel Walk" (Bill Chase) - 8:14

Personnel 
 Woody Herman - clarinet, conductor, vocal on "Camel Walk"
 Sal Nistico, Gordon Brisker, Larry Cavelli - tenor saxophone
 Gene Allen - baritone saxophone
 Bill Chase  - lead trumpet & arranger
 Paul Fontaine, Dave Gale, Ziggy Harrell, Gerald Lamy - trumpet
 Phil Wilson, Eddie Morgan - trombone
 Jack Gale - trombone & arranger,
 Nat Pierce - piano & arranger
 Chuck Andrus - double bass
 Jake Hanna - drums

Production
 Hollis King - art direction
 Isabelle Wong - design
 Ken Druker - executive producer
 Ralph J. Gleason - liner notes
 Jeff Willens - mastering
 Jack Tracy - producer
 Bryan Koniarz - reissue producer
 Mark Smith - reissue production assistant

References

1963 albums
Woody Herman albums
Philips Records albums